Brigitte Haentjens,  is a Canadian theatre director and president of her own company, Sybillines, which she founded in 1997.<ref name=StHilaire>Jean St-Hilaire, "Brigitte Haentjens reçoit le prestigieux prix Siminovitch", Le Soleil, online posting in Cyberpresse, October 30, 2007, accessed January 18, 2008.</ref> She is currently the Artistic Director at Canada's National Arts Centre French Theatre in Ottawa.

Biography
Born in France, she studied theatre in Paris before moving to Ontario in Canada at the age of 25.

Career
From 1982 to 1990, she was artistic director of the Théâtre du Nouvel-Ontario in Sudbury, turning it into a major venue of Francophone Canadian theatre through her productions of works by playwrights such as Michel Marc Bouchard and Jean-Marc Dalpé.  She also cowrote several works with Dalpé, including Nickel.

In 1990, she moved to Montreal, becoming artistic director of the Nouvelle Compagnie Théâtrale, in Montréal, from 1991 to 1994, and as co-director for the Carrefour International de Théâtre de Québec from 1996 to 2006. In addition to continuing to direct theatre for several companies in Montreal, she also directed at the National Arts Centre, in Ottawa, founded her own company, Sybillines, in 1997, and, in October 2007, received the prestigious Elinor and Louis Siminovitch Prize in Theatre for her 30-year career in Québec theatre.

Notes

External linksPrix Siminovitch'' – Elinore & Lou Siminovitch Theatre Prize Official website.  Accessed January 19, 2008.  [Provides links to the press release about the 2007 award to Haentjens (in English), to the text of her acceptance speech (in English), and to a video about her work (in English with French subtitles).]
"Sybillines" – Official website.  Accessed January 18, 2008.  (In French; includes biography.)
"Haentjens" – A part of the Haentjens History Mai 28, 2008.  (In French;)

Canadian dramatists and playwrights in French
Canadian theatre directors
Living people
French emigrants to Canada
20th-century Canadian dramatists and playwrights
Canadian women dramatists and playwrights
20th-century Canadian women writers
Officers of the Order of Canada
Year of birth missing (living people)

Canadian artistic directors